Laurin Mincy (born February 3, 1992) is an American professional women's basketball player.

Career

High school
At University High in Newark Mincy was a household name. In her freshman year she was the first  freshman ever named to New Jersey All-State team and in the same year led University High School to its first state title. Her accomplishments in High School include playing in the McDonald's All-American Game in 2010 after her senior year being a 2 time New Jersey Star-Ledger Player of the Year (2008, '09) 2009 New Jersey Gatorade Player of the Year. She was also named a "Girl Athlete to Remember" by nj.com as one of the best of the decade and was two-time first team All-Tri State, Three-time All-County, three-time All-Conference and the 2007 Essex County Player of the Year, along with 2 state championships.

College
Mincy played college basketball at the University of Maryland in College Park, Maryland for the Terrapins in the Big Ten Conference of NCAA Division I. In 5 years with Maryland she averaged 24.5 Points Per Game.

Israel
After her college career, Mincy began her professional career with Electra Ramat Hasharon in Israel's Ligat ha'Al, for the 2015–16 season. There, she averaged 15.9 points and 3.3 assists per game. For the 2016–17 season, Mincy remained in Israel, signing with Hapoel Rishon LeZion. However, Mincy left the team after just four games.

Australia
Mincy signed with the Townsville Fire for the 2017–18 WNBL season. Mincy played alongside  Claudia Brassard, and the likes of Suzy Batkovic and Cayla George and Ended up winning the WNBL Championship in 2017

Athletes Unlimited
In 2021 Mincy signed to play for Athletes Unlimited new basketball league which is running from January 26 through February 26, 2022 in Las Vegas. The league takes place over 5 weeks and there are no set rosters, instead captains pick their new teams each week. This model allows for players to have more options and also for fans to directly impact and interact with the games and teams.

References

1992 births
Living people
American women's basketball players
Basketball players from Newark, New Jersey
University of Maryland, College Park alumni
Townsville Fire players
Guards (basketball)
21st-century American women
New York Liberty draft picks